Zakir Hussain (born 24 December 1964) is an Indian former cricketer. He played first-class cricket for Hyderabad and the United Arab Emirates between 1988 and 2005.

See also
 List of Hyderabad cricketers

References

External links
 

1964 births
Living people
Indian cricketers
Hyderabad cricketers
Emirati cricketers
Cricketers from Hyderabad, India
Indian emigrants to the United Arab Emirates
Indian expatriate sportspeople in the United Arab Emirates